Libellula pontica is a species of dragonfly in the family Libellulidae. It is found in Armenia, Iran, Iraq, Israel, Jordan, Kyrgyzstan, Syria, and Turkey. Its natural habitats are swamps, freshwater marshes, ponds, and canals and ditches. It is threatened by habitat loss.

References

Libellulidae
Taxonomy articles created by Polbot
Insects described in 1887